Kangalli station is a railway station in Kangal-li, Onsŏng County, North Hamgyŏng, North Korea, on the Hambuk Line of the Korean State Railway. It is also the starting point of the Sŏngp'yŏng branch to Sŏngp'yŏng.

History
Originally called Tonggwanjin station, it was opened by the Tomun Railway Company on 1 December 1922, together with the rest of the Sangsambong–Chongsŏng section of their line, thereby completing the entirety of the Tomun Railway's line from Hoeryŏng to Tonggwanjin. On 1 April 1929 was nationalised and became the West Tomun Line of the Chosen Government Railway.

On 1 August 1933 the Chosen Government Railway completed their East Tomun Line from Unggi to Tonggwanjin, by closing the final gap between Namyang and here; at the same time, the station was renamed Tonggwan station.

The station received its current name after the establishment of the DPRK.

References

Railway stations in North Korea
Railway stations opened in 1922
1922 establishments in Korea
North Hamgyong